Claudiu Komartin (1983, Bucharest) is a Romanian poet and translator, considered to be one of the most important Romanian poets of his generation.

The first poetry book of Komartin, Păpușarul și alte insomnii, published in 2003, won the Mihai Eminescu National Prize. The second book, Circul domestic, won the Romanian Academy Poetry Prize. In 2010, he initiated The Max Blecher Publishing House, an editorial project aimed at promotion of contemporary Romanian literature, relatively less-known outside of the country, as well as bringing underground Romanian authors closer to the public and eventually integrating them into mainstream literature. Since 2010, Komartin is the editor-in-chief of Poesis international, a literary magazine.

He also translated from French, English and Italian.

Komartin's poetry has been translated to a number of languages, including English, German, French, and Spanish.

Bibliography
 Păpușarul și alte insomnii (Master of puppets & other wakefulnessess), Editura Vinea, Bucharest, 2003
 Circul domestic (Tamed circus), Editura Cartea Romanească, Bucharest, 2005
 Un anotimp în Berceni (A period/time in Berceni), Editura Cartier, Chișinău, 2009
 Cobalt, (Cobalt) Casa de Editură Max Blecher, Bistrița, 2013

References

21st-century Romanian poets
Living people
1983 births